The following is a list of senators in the 26th Parliament of Canada.

Names in bold indicate senators in the 19th Canadian Ministry.

See also
List of current senators of Canada

References

26